Atlanta is an American comedy-drama television series created by Donald Glover. The series follows college dropout and music manager Earnest "Earn" Marks (Glover) and rapper Alfred "Paper Boi" Miles (Brian Tyree Henry) as they navigate a strange, seemingly otherworldly, Atlanta hip hop scene. Atlanta also stars LaKeith Stanfield as Darius, Earn and Alfred's eccentric friend, and Zazie Beetz as Vanessa "Van" Kiefer, Earn's on-again-off-again girlfriend and the mother of his daughter.

The series was produced by RBA, 343 Incorporated, MGMT. Entertainment, and FXP and is primarily set and filmed in Atlanta and the surrounding Georgia area; the third season features international filming locations. Atlanta is one of the only American cable television series to feature an all-Black writing staff (featuring Glover as writer, executive producer, and showrunner), with much of the focus set on examining race, class, identity, the American Dream, existentialism, and modern African-American culture through an Afro-Surrealist lens. It is also notable for its use of bottle and standalone episodes, which often do not feature the main cast.

Atlanta premiered on September 6, 2016, and was initially exclusively broadcast on cable channel FX in the United States and internationally through the Fox Networks Group, and was distributed in the United States by Disney–ABC Domestic Television. The fourth and final season concluded on November 10, 2022, with the series containing 41 episodes overall.

Atlanta is often regarded as one of the greatest television series of the 21st century. It has received numerous awards and nominations, including two Golden Globe Awards for Best Television Series – Musical or Comedy; Glover has received the Golden Globe Award for Best Actor – Television Series Musical or Comedy, and two Primetime Emmy Awards, one for Outstanding Lead Actor in a Comedy Series and one Outstanding Directing for a Comedy Series, the latter being the first ever awarded to an African-American.

Plot
The series follows Earn (Donald Glover) during his daily life in Atlanta, Georgia, as he tries to redeem himself in the eyes of his ex-girlfriend Van (Zazie Beetz), who is also the mother of his daughter Lottie; as well as his parents and his cousin Alfred (Brian Tyree Henry), who raps under the stage name "Paper Boi". Having dropped out of Princeton University, Earn has no money and no home and consequently alternates between staying with his parents and his ex-girlfriend. Once he realizes that his cousin is on the verge of stardom, he seeks to reconnect with him in order to improve his life and the life of his daughter.

Although there is an overarching story depicting Earn and Paper Boi's struggles as the latter ascends through the hip hop scene, the series has been noted for its lack of emphasis on multi-episode story arcs, instead using a somewhat surrealistic style of episodic storytelling that Glover has likened to short stories, as have some critics.

Cast and characters

Main
 Donald Glover as Earnest "Earn" Marks – a Princeton dropout turned music manager for his cousin Alfred. Earn is intelligent but cynical and often reckless and initially struggles with homelessness and poverty. He is also in an on-again-off-again relationship with Vanessa, with whom he shares a daughter, Lottie.
 Glover also portrays Teddy Perkins in the episode of the same name, a mentally disturbed recluse with bleached skin.
 Glover also portrays Kirkwood Chocolate in the episode "Work Ethic!", a film and television magnate who produces entertainment that exploits black people.
 Brian Tyree Henry as Alfred "Paper Boi" Miles – Earn's cousin and a rapper who exhibits signs of depression and moral dilemma as he navigates his newfound fame.
 LaKeith Stanfield as Darius – Alfred's and Earn's eccentric Nigerian-born friend, who often expresses comments on various aspects of the human condition.
 Zazie Beetz as Vanessa "Van" Kiefer – Earn's on-again-off-again biracial Afro-German girlfriend, Lottie's mother, and former grade school science teacher. Van often struggles with the pressure of raising her daughter.

Recurring
 Harold House Moore as Swiff (season 1) – Earn's friend and co-worker
 Khris Davis as Tracy (season 2; guest season 4) – Alfred's recently paroled friend who often clashes with Earn.
 RJ Walker as Clark County (season 2), an egotistical, commercialized rapper that Alfred befriends. Darius and Earn view him as an industry plant.

The series also features guest appearances by celebrities who portray fictionalized versions of themselves. Offset, Quavo, and Takeoff portray Alfred's drug suppliers. Gunna and Jai Paul appear as a partygoer and a poker player, respectively. Lloyd and Jaleel White feature as participants in a charity basketball game. Jane Adams plays an agent who confuses Earn for someone else. Michael Vick portrays a quarterback who challenges club-goers to foot races. Alexander Skarsgård portrays a sexually-depraved cannibal. Liam Neeson and Soulja Boy make appearances that reference their 2019 controversial comments and "Crank That" dance, respectively. Brian McKnight, Sinbad and Jenna Wortham appeared in the mockumentary about Thomas Washington. In the series finale, Cree Summer was a customer Darius talked to at the drugstore.

Episodes

Production 
FX first began developing the show in August 2013, and then the pilot was ordered to series by FX Networks in December 2014. It was directed by Hiro Murai and shot in Atlanta. It got picked up to series with a 10-episode order in October 2015. Glover, who grew up in Atlanta and also works as a musician, stated that "the city influenced the tone of the show".

The series is also notable for having an all-Black writing staff, which is virtually unheard of in American television. The writer's room consists of Glover himself, his brother Stephen Glover, and members of his rap collective 'Royalty' including Fam Udeorji (Glover's manager), Ibra Ake (Glover's longtime photographer), and Jamal Olori. Stefani Robinson, a writer for Man Seeking Woman, and Taofik Kolade round out the writer's room. During an interview with The New Yorker, Glover stated the characters smoke cannabis because "they have PTSD — every Black person does". The show is shot in 2K resolution, produced and edited by Kyle Reiter and Isaac Hagy, and broadcast on FX in 720p.

In January 2017, the series was renewed for a second season; however, FX announced the series would not return until 2018 due to Glover's busy production schedule. Glover revealed that the second season takes inspiration from Tiny Toon Adventures, specifically How I Spent My Vacation.

The series was renewed for a third season in June 2018, which was originally planned for a 2019 premiere, but was delayed due to scheduling conflicts. In August 2019, FX renewed the series for a fourth season and announced that the third and fourth seasons would begin filming in early 2020, with each season consisting of eight episodes. In January 2020, FX announced that the third season's episode count was increased to 10 episodes, and that both seasons were planned to air in 2021–season 3 in January and season 4 later that year. Both seasons were also planned to be shot together and that one of the seasons would be filmed outside the United States. However, production was postponed in March 2020 due to the COVID-19 pandemic. In September 2020, it was reported that the third season would not be able to make the January 2021 premiere date that was originally planned. Filming for the third and fourth seasons began in early April 2021, in London, with additional filming in Amsterdam and Paris. By August 2021, filming for the third season was completed and production began on the fourth season in Atlanta, and it was confirmed that the third season would premiere in early 2022. The third season premiered with two episodes on March 24, 2022.

By February 2022, both seasons three and four had completed filming, and it was announced that the fourth would be the final season.

Release

International broadcast 
The first season was broadcast in the UK on BBC Two, from May 13, 2018, to June 17, 2018.

Home media 
The Complete First Season was released on DVD in Region 1 on March 6, 2018, and The Complete Second Season (Robbin' Season) was released on DVD on December 17, 2019.

Reception

Critical response

Atlanta has received widespread acclaim from television critics. The review aggregation website Rotten Tomatoes gives the first season an approval rating of 97% based on 123 reviews, with an average rating of 8.6/10. The website's critical consensus reads, "Ambitious and refreshing, Atlanta offers a unique vehicle for star and series creator Donald Glover's eccentric brand of humor—as well as a number of timely, trenchant observations." On Metacritic, the first season has a score of 90 out of 100, based on reviews from 36 critics, indicating "universal acclaim".

David Wiegand of the San Francisco Chronicle gave it a highly positive review, writing: "The scripts for the four episodes made available to critics are as richly nuanced as anything you'll see on TV or, to be sure, in a movie theater. You will not only know these characters after only one episode, you'll be hooked on them, as well. In so many areas, Atlanta sets the bar exceptionally high." Sonia Saraiya of Variety also praised the series, declaring it a "finished, cinematic, and beautiful production that may be one of the best new shows of the fall."

The second season received further critical acclaim. On Rotten Tomatoes, it has an approval rating of 98%, based on 200 reviews, with an average rating of 9.1/10. The site's critical consensus reads, "Donald Glover continues to subvert expectations with a sophomore season of Atlanta that proves as excellent as it is eccentric." On Metacritic, the second season has a score of 97 out of 100, based on 28 critics, indicating "universal acclaim".

In 2019, Atlanta was ranked 10th on The Guardians list of the 100 best TV shows of the 21st century. The Writers Guild Foundation listed the season 1 episode "Streets on Lock" as having one of the best scripts of 2010s film and television, writing, "The story features fully realized supporting players and miscreants, but right when we start laughing, everything takes a sour turn, causing us to reflect on what we’re really laughing at".

The third season has a score of 93 out of 100 on Metacritic, based on 24 critics, indicating "universal acclaim". On Rotten Tomatoes, it has an approval rating of 97%, based on 130 reviews, with an average rating of 8.8/10. The site's critical consensus reads, "Atlanta takes Paper Boi and his entourage out of Georgia, but this inspired third season proves that the more things change, the more they stay weird."

The fourth season has a score of 82 out of 100 on Metacritic, based on 10 critics, indicating "universal acclaim". On Rotten Tomatoes, it has an approval rating of 96%, based on 98 reviews, with an average rating of 9.0/10. The site's critical consensus reads, "Foregrounding its characters and namesake again after an anthological sojourn in Europe, Atlanta closes out in its sweet spot: funny, insightful, and weird as hell."

In 2022, Rolling Stone ranked Atlanta as the ninth-greatest TV show of all time.

Accolades

Season 1

Season 2

Season 3

Season 4

References

External links
 
 

Atlanta (TV series)
2010s American comedy-drama television series
2010s American surreal comedy television series
2010s American black television series
2016 American television series debuts
2022 American television series endings
2020s American comedy-drama television series
2020s American surreal comedy television series
2020s American black television series
American black television series
Best Musical or Comedy Series Golden Globe winners
Culture of Atlanta
English-language television shows
FX Networks original programming
Hip hop television
Peabody Award-winning television programs
Primetime Emmy Award-winning television series
Television shows filmed in Atlanta
Television shows filmed in France
Television shows set in Atlanta
Television shows shot in London
Television series by 20th Century Fox Television